
The Oriel Square tennis court was a real tennis court that was located in Oriel Square, central Oxford, England. The Liber Albus mentions the Oriel court being in Vinehall Lane in 1577.

Charles I played tennis here with his nephew Prince Rupert in December 1642 and King Edward VII had his first tennis lesson here in 1859.

The court survived until 1923, when it was used as a lecture hall by Oriel College, though it may have seen earlier use as a theatre. The site is now the location of Oriel College's Harris Building, used for student accommodation, a seminar room and lecture theatre.

The only active court left in the city is the Merton Street tennis court.

Further reading 
 Tennis and Oxford by Jeremy Potter; 1st edition of 1994; 152 pp in 8vo and dw.

References 

1923 disestablishments in the United Kingdom
Defunct real tennis venues
Tennis court
Former buildings and structures in Oxford
Sport at the University of Oxford
Buildings and structures of the University of Oxford
Sports venues in Oxford